HMS Lamerton was a Type II  destroyer of the Royal Navy. She was sold to the Indian Navy in 1952, where she served as INS Gomati.

Following the war, early in 1946, she was reduced to Reserve status at Harwich.

Royal Navy
Lamerton was ordered on 3 September 1939 under the 1939 War Emergency Build Programme. She was laid down as Job No. J4142. She was commissioned on 16 August 1941.

Operation Torch
At 1230 on 6 November, the Spanish fishing vessel Jesus Dei Gran was sighted to the south-east. Vice Admiral Burrough ordered Lamerton to board her and to send her under armed guard to Gibraltar. The crew, according to Burrough, were "very friendly and in no way resented this interruption of their peaceful occupation".
Cape Caxine and all coastal lights were visible.

Indian Navy

The three ships became the 22nd Destroyer Squadron, with Bedale (now INS Godavari) as the leader. They would all require refits which were expected to cost approximately £120,000 and take around eight months. The ships were initially loaned to India on seven conditions:
 India would be responsible for any work required before taking over the ships, including installing any equipment
 Armament and logistic support would be provided free of charge, but equivalent amounts were to be returned at the end of the loan period
 The standard of maintenance, and the period between refits, would be the same as when in Royal Navy service
 All additions and alterations were to be at India's expense, and subject to the approval of the Admiralty
 When the vessels were returned, they should be returned with stores, and in good condition (allowing for wear and tear)
 In the event of any loss, compensation would be payable
 That the loan would be for three years initially, subject to extension by an agreement: but the vessels would be returned if the UK needed them in an emergency - although the Royal Navy had plenty of frigates, NATO had a shortage of them.

The transfer deal was agreed by Clement Attlee on 22 October 1951, and the Indian government were informed on the same day. She was commissioned into the Indian Navy on 24 April 1953, with the commissioning ceremony being performed by Shrimati Saraswati Kher, wife of Shri Kher, the Indian High Commissioner. Unusually, she was still named Lamerton at this time, rather than Gomati, and her commissioning orders were issued by a British Admiral, Sir Maurice Mansergh. It was not until 18 June 1953 that the ships took their Indian names at a ceremony in Liverpool, with a 'breaking of coconuts' rather than the breaking of bottles of champagne being carried out by the wife of Captain G S Kapoor.

The first commander was Lieutenant Commander Inder Singh, who later rose to the rank of Commodore. The Executive Officer was Lieutenant R N Batra.

The lease was extended in August 1956, and she was sold to India in April 1958.

She was deployed as a training ship until 1975, when she was struck from the active list, before being sold for scrapping.

References

Publications
 
  The Hunts: a history of the design, development and careers of the 86 destroyers of this class built for the Royal and Allied Navies during World War II, John English, World Ship Society, 1987,

External links

 

Hunt-class destroyers of the Indian Navy
1940 ships
Hunt-class destroyers of the Royal Navy